Edgar Norwerth (7 April 1884 – 19 September 1950) was a Polish architect. His work was part of the art competitions at the 1928 Summer Olympics and the 1932 Summer Olympics.

References

1884 births
1950 deaths
20th-century Polish architects
Olympic competitors in art competitions
People from the canton of Vaud
Saint-Petersburg State University of Architecture and Civil Engineering alumni